The 2018–19 Arizona State Sun Devils women's basketball team represents Arizona State University during the 2018–19 NCAA Division I women's basketball season. The Sun Devils, led by twenty second year head coach Charli Turner Thorne, play their games at Wells Fargo Arena and were members of the Pac-12 Conference. They finished the season 22–11, 10–7 in Pac-12 play to finish in fifth place. They advanced to the quarterfinals of the Pac-12 women's tournament where they lost to UCLA. They received an at-large bid to the NCAA women's tournament where they defeated UCF and Miami (FL) in the first and second rounds before losing to Mississippi State in the sweet sixteen.

Roster

Schedule

|-
!colspan=9 style=| Non-conference regular season

|-
!colspan=9 style=| Pac-12 regular season

|-
!colspan=9 style=| Pac-12 Women's Tournament

|-
!colspan=9 style=| NCAA Women's Tournament

Rankings

^Coaches' Poll did not release a second poll at the same time as the AP.

See also
2018–19 Arizona State Sun Devils men's basketball team

References

Arizona State Sun Devils women's basketball seasons
Arizona State
Arizona State Sun Devils women's basketball
Arizona State Sun Devils women's basketball
Arizona State